USS LST/LST(H)/T-LST-488 was an  built for the United States Navy during World War II.

Construction
LST-488 was laid down on 11 January 1943, under Maritime Commission (MARCOM) contract, MC hull 1008, by  Kaiser Shipyards, Yard No. 4, Richmond, California; launched on 5 March 1943;  and commissioned on 24 May 1943.

Service history
During World War II, LST-488 was assigned to the Asiatic-Pacific Theater and participated in the following operations: the Occupation and defense of Cape Torokina in November 1943; the Capture and occupation of Guam in July 1944;  the Battle of Leyte landings October 1944; and the Lingayen Gulf landings January 1945.

Post-war service
Following the war, LST-488 was redesignated LST(H)-488 on 15 September 1945, and performed occupation duty in the Far East until 11 January 1946. Upon her return to the United States, she was decommissioned on 11 January 1946. She was redesignated LST-488 on 6 March 1952, and served with the Military Sea Transportation Service as USNS LST-488 in the postwar period. The ship was transferred to the Republic of the Philippines as a lease on 15 July 1972.

Awards 
LST-488 earned four battle stars for World War II service.

Notes 

Citations

Bibliography 

Online resources

External links

 

LST-1-class tank landing ships of the United States Navy
Ships built in Richmond, California
1943 ships
LST-1-class tank landing ships of the Philippine Navy
S3-M2-K2 ships
World War II amphibious warfare vessels of the United States